A skin test is a medical test in which a substance is injected into the skin.

Examples 
 Casoni test
 Corneometry
 Dick test
 Fernandez reaction
 Frei test
 Hair perforation test
 Kveim test
 Leishmanin skin test
 Lepromin
 Patch test
 Schick test
 Skin allergy test
 Sweat diagnostics
 Sweat test
 Tine test
 Transepidermal water loss
 Trichoscopy

References